Keith Berry (born 1973) is a London-based musician and composer, often working in the field of minimalist and ambient music. He has released material on labels such as trente oiseaux, Crouton Music, Authorized Version, and Twenty Hertz. Berry claims to have been influenced by literary and philosophic sources, such as Aldous Huxley, Lao Tzu, Nietzsche, Wabi-Sabi, Zen, and the I Ching.

Collaborative Recordings
bleu : résultat  [ chat blanc records ] CD 2006
58 Degrees North [ Iain Stewart, self-release ] DVD 2006

Compilation Recordings
Coincident  [ Entr'acte ] CD 2006
I, Mute Hummings  [ ex ovo ] CD 2006

External links

1973 births
Living people
English composers